Grand & Toy is a Canadian B2B end-to-end supplier of office products and services, founded in 1882 by James Grand as a home-based stationery printing business. It is owned by The ODP Corporation, whose other brands include Office Depot and OfficeMax.

History
Grand & Toy was founded in 1882 by James Grand as a home-based stationery printing business. A year later, Grand partnered with his brother-in-law, Samuel Toy, to open their first retail store. In 1885, the business moved to a larger location and grew to have a staff of twelve. Then, in 1912, Grand & Toy added an office furniture department, and four years later, the business added printing facilities and a bindery. By 1982, when the company celebrated its centennial anniversary, Grand & Toy had 35 locations.

In 1996, Grand & Toy was purchased by Boise Office Solutions, later renamed OfficeMax, a US-based international office supplies distributor, for US$104 million. By 2013, the company had repositioned itself as an end-to-end provider of business solutions.

In 2008, the company's distribution network, one of the largest in Canada, made 8.4 million deliveries.

In early 2013, the company rebranded as "OfficeMax Grand & Toy", as part of an effort by its U.S. parent company to present a unified brand to customers across North America. However, by the end of the year, OfficeMax had merged with U.S. competitor Office Depot.

On 23 April 2014, OfficeMax Grand & Toy announced it would be focusing on online retail, which accounted for 97% of its sales. The company closed its remaining 19 retail locations.

In December 2014, the Canadian operation announced it would rebrand back to simply "Grand & Toy", explaining the reversal as an expression of "confidence in Grand & Toy's brand legacy and a strong commitment to its long-term success".

In 2016, Grand & Toy and TerraCycle Canada announced a national retailer recycling program for office products. The program includes recycling for coffee capsules, office supplies, and computer accessories.

In May 2021, Office Depot announced that it would be splitting into two companies: ODP and NewCo. NewCo will include Office Depot’s business solutions division and Grand & Toy.

Corporate social responsibility
, Grand & Toy's social responsibility  efforts include waste and recycling programs, green products and services, thought leadership and business insights, and transportation efficiency.

References

External links

 

Office Depot
Companies based in Toronto
Office supply companies of Canada
Online retailers of Canada
Retail companies established in 1882
1882 establishments in Ontario
1996 mergers and acquisitions
Canadian subsidiaries of foreign companies
Canadian companies established in 1882